Bam-e Gurinja (also Romanized as Bām-e Gūrīnjā; also known as Bon-e Jarri) is a village in Mahur Rural District, Mahvarmilani District, Mamasani County, Fars Province, Iran. At the 2006 census, its population was 12, in 5 families.

References 

Populated places in Mamasani County